Komar-e Olya (also Romanized as Komār-e ‘Olyā, Komār ‘Olyā, and Kamar Olya; also known as Kamar Bālā, Komār, Komar Bālā, Komār-e Bālā, Kūh Mār, Yukāri Qamar, Yūkhārī Gomār, Yukhari Kemar, and Yūkhārī Komār) is a village in Dizmar-e Gharbi Rural District, Siah Rud District, Jolfa County, East Azerbaijan Province, Iran. At the 2006 census, its population was 571, in 135 families.

References 

Populated places in Jolfa County